André-Gustave Citroën (5 February 1878 – 3 July 1935) was a French industrialist and the founder of French automaker Citroën. He is also remembered for his application of double helical gears.

Life and career
Born in Paris in 1878, André-Gustave Citroën was the fifth and last child of Jewish parents, diamond merchant Levie Citroën and Masza Amelia Kleinman. He was a cousin of the British philosopher Sir A. J. Ayer (the only son of his aunt Reine).

His father died by suicide when André was six years old (presumably after failure in a business venture in a diamond mine in South Africa). It is reputed that the young André Citroën was inspired by the works of Jules Verne and had seen the construction of the Eiffel Tower for the World Exhibition, making him want to become an engineer.

In that year he visited Poland, the birthland of his mother, who had recently died. During that holiday, he saw a carpenter working on a set of gears with a fish bone structure. These gears were less noisy, and more efficient. 

Citroën bought the patent for very little money, leading to the invention that is credited to Citroën: double helical gears. Their distinctive pattern was reputed to be the inspiration for the  marque of the Citroën brand. In 1908, he was installed as a chairman for the automotive company Mors, where he was very successful.

During World War I, he was responsible for mass production of armaments. Citroën gained an international reputation during the war, and more as the leading production expert in France. His activities were extensive in connection with the Renault plant, which employed 35,000 men in the manufacture of munitions during the war.

In the middle of 1919, Citroën was one of the directors of the Société Française Doble, Paris, to build steam cars in France. Some other directors of the company were Paul Sicault, of the Renault Co.; M. Mery, of the Turcat-Mery Co.; M. Delage, the automobile designer. The design was not feasible and Citroën turned to other projects.

Citroën founded the Citroën automobile company in 1919, leading it to become the fourth largest automobile manufacturer in the world by the beginning of the 1930s (specifically 1932). The costs of developing the advanced front wheel drive unibody Traction Avant and redeveloping the factory to produce it at the same time, led to bankruptcy in 1934. It was taken over by the main creditor Michelin, who had provided tires for the cars. The Traction Avant after initial problems improved the sales for the company, and was a great success and was in production apart from during World War II until 1957.

He died in Paris, France, of stomach cancer in 1935, and was interred in the Montparnasse Cemetery, the funeral being led by the Chief Rabbi of Paris.

Posthumous recognition
On 9 October 1958, while the Motor show was running, the city fathers renamed the Quai de Javel as the "Quai André-Citroën," in recognition of the transformation effected since the city's 15th arrondissement, two generations earlier characterized by market gardening, had been selected by Citroën as the location for Europe's first mass production car plant. 

This was the second celebrity name for the street which in 1843 had been baptised "Quai de Javel," in recognition of the chemical factory that had been set up to produce a range of industrial acids, and which later numbered the well known eponymous "Eau de Javel" (bleach) among its products.

In 1992, the Parc André Citroën public garden in Paris was named after him. It was built on the site of the former automobile manufacturing plant of Citroën, which operated until its closure in the 1970s, and which had been demolished during an eight-year period, between 1976 and 1984. In 1998, André-Citroën was inducted into the Automotive Hall of Fame in Dearborn, Michigan.

See also
 Arthur Constantin Krebs, Panhard General Manager from 1897 to 1916

References

Bibliography

External links

Insecula encyclopedia 
Citroënët
 

1878 births
1935 deaths
Citroën
French chief executives
French automotive pioneers
Engineers from Paris
French automobile designers
French founders of automobile manufacturers
École Polytechnique alumni
Lycée Louis-le-Grand alumni
French people of Dutch-Jewish descent
19th-century French Jews
Deaths from cancer in France
Deaths from stomach cancer
Burials at Montparnasse Cemetery
Lycée Condorcet alumni
Businesspeople from Paris
French Freemasons